Sin Gwang-su (1712–1775) was a poet of the late Joseon Dynasty. Living in the time of King Yeongjo, he was unable to attain a position of rank because his family was aligned with the Southerners faction. He married the daughter of Yun Duseo and became associated with Silhak. At 39, Sin finally passed the higher exam of the gwageo and was sent to Jeju as an official. He wrote a description of the island. His famed words from later life include the Gwan sang yung ma (Hangeul:관산융마 Hanja:關山戎馬) and Gwanseo akbu (Hangeul:관서악부 Hanja:關西樂府).

See also
Korean literature
List of Joseon Dynasty people

External links
Empas entry, in Korean

Korean male poets
1712 births
1775 deaths
18th-century Korean poets